Ann Zacharias (born 19 September 1956) is a Swedish actress. She appeared in fifteen films and television shows between 1971 and 1988. She is the mother of Swedish actress Sascha Zacharias.

Selected filmography
 The Last Adventure (1974)
 The Wing or the Thigh (1976)
 At Night All Cats Are Crazy (1977)

References

External links

1956 births
Living people
20th-century Swedish actresses
Swedish film actresses
Swedish television actresses
Actresses from Stockholm